Alan James Browne (born 15 April 1995) is an Irish professional footballer who plays as a central midfielder for Preston North End and the Republic of Ireland national team.

Career

Cork City
Browne joined the Cork City U19 squad prior to the start of the 2012–13 season, graduating to the senior squad the following season.
He was named on the substitutes' bench twice in the 2013 season for games against Sligo Rovers and Drogheda United, but he failed to make a first-team appearance for the club before leaving.

Preston North End
Browne signed an 18-month contract with Preston North End in League One, joining them on 1 January 2014.

He made his first-team debut on 25 March 2014, coming on as a substitute in a 3–1 victory against Peterborough United with the score at 1–1, with a contribution and work ethic that drew praise from manager Simon Grayson.

In 2015, Browne was involved in the play-off final win, which saw Preston promoted to the Championship.

Browne became a major part of the Preston squad throughout the 2017–18 season, scoring eight' goals. This led to him earning the clubs Player of the Year award.

From the 2020-21 season Browne was appointed club captain following the departure of Tom Clarke. On 13 January 2021, Browne signed a new three-and-a-half year deal with the club, seeing him under contract until the end of the 2023–24 season.

International career

On 24 March 2021, Browne scored his first competitive goal for Ireland, a header to give them the lead in a 3-2 defeat away to Serbia in the 2022 FIFA World Cup qualifiers.

Career statistics

Club

International

International goals
As of match played 11 June 2022. Ireland score listed first, score column indicates score after each Browne goal.

Honours
Preston North End
Football League One play-offs: 2015

Individual
FAI Young Player of the Year 2019

References

External links

1995 births
Living people
Republic of Ireland association footballers
Republic of Ireland under-21 international footballers
Association football midfielders
Cork City F.C. players
Preston North End F.C. players
Association footballers from Cork (city)
English Football League players
Republic of Ireland youth international footballers
Republic of Ireland international footballers
Republic of Ireland expatriate association footballers